Sam Zeloof (born ) is an American autodidact who, at the age of 17, constructed a home microchip fabrication facility in his parents' garage. In 2018, he produced the first homebrew lithographically fabricated microchip, the Zeloof Z1, a PMOS dual differential amplifier chip. In 2021, he achieved a transistor count of 100 with the creation of the Zeloof Z2, a transistor array. His work takes inspiration from Jeri Ellsworth's 'Cooking with Jeri' which demonstrates a homebrew transistor and logic gate fabrication process. His photolithography process is currently able to create details as small as 300 nanometers.

Zeloof attended Hunterdon Central Regional High School. In 2022, Zeloof along with Jim Keller started Atomic Semi, a startup to manufacture small batches of affordable microchips quickly.

References

Year of birth missing (living people)
Living people
American electronics engineers
American inventors
Hunterdon Central Regional High School alumni